Grey Henson (born July 2, 1990) is an American actor, dancer, and singer. He originated the role as Damian Hubbard in the Broadway production of Mean Girls, for which he earned a nomination for a 2018 Tony Award for Best Actor in a Featured Role in a Musical. He also played Elder McKinley in both the Broadway and US national touring productions of The Book of Mormon.

Early life and education 
Henson grew up in Macon, Georgia, and was a performer on the stages of Macon Little Theatre, Theatre Macon, and Madison’s School of Dance, which he credits for his love of performing.

Henson received a Bachelor of Fine Arts in Acting/Musical Theatre from Carnegie Mellon University School of Drama in 2012. At Carnegie Mellon University, Henson performed in Assassins as Samuel Byck and Sweeney Todd as Beadle Bamford.

Acting career 
As a junior at Carnegie Mellon, Henson auditioned for the national touring company of The Book of Mormon and ultimately joined the cast in the role of Elder McKinley. The tour began in August 2012. Henson then took over the role on Broadway from August 26, 2014, until August 21, 2016.

Henson joined the original cast of the musical Mean Girls as Damian Hubbard in 2017. The musical, based on the film of the same name, premiered as an out-of-town tryout at the National Theatre in Washington, D.C., on October 31, 2017, and ended December 3, 2017. The musical began previews on Broadway on March 12, 2018, and officially opened April 8, 2018. Co-star Barrett Wilbert Weed and Henson worked together to receive their roles in the production. His final performance in the role was March 8, 2020. Henson called the role "a dream".

In 2022, Henson appeared in the Peacock series Girls5eva as Tate.

Acting credits

Theatre

Television

Accolades

References

External links
 
 
 

Living people
1990 births
21st-century American male actors
American male musical theatre actors
Carnegie Mellon University alumni